Felicia alba is a species of flowering plant in the family Asteraceae. It is endemic to Namibia. Its habitat is sometimes degraded by livestock and agricultural crops, but its population is generally stable.

References

alba
Endemic flora of Namibia
Taxonomy articles created by Polbot
Plants described in 1973